Ayrk is a village in the Vardenis Municipality of the Gegharkunik Province of Armenia.

History 
The village contains the Church of St. Astvatsatsin dated to 1181 AD, and the 13th-century Katoghike St. Gevorg church, 150 meters apart from each other. Both churches have large adjoining cemeteries, and between them are the remains of massive stone walls of an Iron Age fortification with shallow caves below.

Gallery

References

External links 

 
 

Populated places in Gegharkunik Province